Sean David Grande (born December 11, 1971) is an American television and radio sportscaster. He is primarily known as the voice of the Boston Celtics, but has called virtually every sport over a 25-year career.

Grande provides play-by-play coverage alongside analyst Cedric Maxwell for all Boston Celtics radio broadcasts. The duo is known as “Grande and Max.” Only legendary Celtic radio voice Johnny Most and cable television voice Mike Gorman have called more Celtics games than Grande. On December 2, 2009 in San Antonio, Grande became the third man in NBA history to call 1,000 NBA games before age 40. He called his 2,000th in the NBA Playoff Bubble August 21, 2020.

Biography
Grande's broadcast career included a seven-year stint at WEEI (1991–1998), the final three as sports director. The versatile Grande has called WNBA basketball for the Minnesota Lynx (1999–2001) and Connecticut Sun (2006–2007), MFS Pro Tennis, Providence Bruins hockey, Harvard basketball and even Major League Soccer. He co-hosted the 1998 NCAA Hockey Selection show on ESPN2 and served three years as host of the Stanley Cup Playoffs on NHL Radio. In 2005, he became a regular host of Fox Sports Net's Sports Tonight.  In 2013, he joined Joe Castiglione calling Red Sox games on WEEI when Dave O'Brien was on assignment until he, Maxwell and the Celtics departed for 98.5 the Sports Hub.  In 2021, "Grande and Max" passed the legendary team of Mike Gorman and Tom Heinsohn, calling the most games as a pair in Celtics history.  In 2022, Grande began splitting Celtics television play-by-play, with Gorman calling home games and Grande joining Brian Scalabrine on the road.

Early career in Boston
Grande was born in New York City, and attended Boston University, graduating in 1993. He spent seven seasons calling hockey, football and basketball on both television and radio for the Terriers. In 1996, he moved to Boston College, as the voice of the Eagles football and hockey radio networks for three seasons until 1999. On the television side, Grande was the original voice of the Hockey East Game of the Week on Fox Sports Net. He was a fixture on the original Sportsradio WEEI in Boston from 1991 until leaving for the NBA in 1998.

College hockey career
In the fall of 1989, Grande called his first on-air game; fittingly, it was a hockey game between Boston U and Providence. It was the start of a long-term relationship with college hockey. His college hockey work for Fox and the NCAA Tournament has garnered him three New England Emmy nominations including the 1999 Emmy for Best Play-by-Play. He's served six years as the television voice of the NCAA East Regional. 2016, his 27th consecutive year broadcasting the sport, concluded with his fourteenth turn as “Voice of the Frozen Four” on CBS Radio. Grande has called a record 16 NCAA Championship Games.

ABC Sports and return to Boston
Grande was recruited back to Boston in 2001 after serving three years as the television voice of the NBA's Minnesota Timberwolves. When he signed with Minnesota in 1998, he was the youngest announcer in the NBA. The versatile Grande's play-by-play credits also include two seasons as part of ABC Sports College Football broadcast team, joining the likes of Keith Jackson and Brent Musburger. His call of the January 1, 2001 Florida Citrus Bowl on ABC was seen in over ten million homes. In 2003, the readers of Boston Sports Media Watch voted him the best play-by-play announcer in Boston.

Film and television appearances
Sean Grande made his major motion picture debut with a cameo, as himself, in the 2001 release Joe Somebody starring Tim Allen. His call of Ricky Davis' buzzer-beater in November 2005 was used in the soundtrack of the final season premiere of HBO's The Sopranos in 2006.

MMA and Boxing
In July 2015, Grande signed a multi-year deal as the lead play-by-play voice of Spike Sports.  He took over as the announcer for Bellator MMA, the world's #2 mixed martial arts promotion.  After stepping down from Bellator full-time in 2017 to spend more time with his son, Grande continued to call occasional Bellator cards, as well as branching out into boxing with both PBC on FOX and Top Rank Boxing on ESPN.  He returned to Bellator, now on Showtime, in 2021 to split the play-by-load with Mauro Ranallo.

Personal

In October of 2018, it was announced on CBS This Morning and Inside the NBA that Grande had become engaged to CBS News anchor and former ESPN host Dana Jacobson. According to CBS News, they were married on September 28, 2019 in New York.  They live in Cambridge, MA with Grande's son Jack (born 2011).

References

1971 births
Living people
American radio sports announcers
American television sports announcers
Association football commentators
Boston Celtics announcers
Boston Celtics personnel
Boston Red Sox announcers
Boston University alumni
College basketball announcers in the United States
College football announcers
College hockey announcers in the United States
Major League Baseball broadcasters
Minnesota Timberwolves announcers
National Hockey League broadcasters
National Basketball Association broadcasters
Radio personalities from New York City
Radio personalities from Boston
Tennis commentators